The 1949–50 NCAA Division I men's ice hockey season began in November 1949 and concluded with the 1950 NCAA Men's Ice Hockey Tournament's championship game on March 18, 1950 at the Broadmoor Ice Palace in Colorado Springs, Colorado. This was the 3rd season in which an NCAA ice hockey championship was held and is the 56th year overall where an NCAA school fielded a team.

Army, who had been fielding an ice hockey team continually since 1904, elevated the program to major status in 1949.

Boston University began to sponsor ice hockey as a sport again for this season and was selected as one of the two eastern representatives for the NCAA tournament.

Denver's ice hockey program was started this year after the university finished construction of the DU Arena.

Regular season

Season tournaments

Standings

1950 NCAA Tournament

Player stats

Scoring leaders
The following players led the league in points at the conclusion of the season.

GP = Games played; G = Goals; A = Assists; Pts = Points; PIM = Penalty minutes

Leading goaltenders
The following goaltenders led the league in goals against average at the end of the regular season while playing at least 33% of their team's total minutes.

GP = Games played; Min = Minutes played; W = Wins; L = Losses; OT = Overtime/shootout losses; GA = Goals against; SO = Shutouts; SV% = Save percentage; GAA = Goals against average

Awards

NCAA

References

External links
College Hockey Historical Archives
1949–50 NCAA Standings

 
NCAA